WFEA (1370 AM) is a talk radio station in Manchester, New Hampshire.  WFEA's studios and offices are on N. Commercial St. in Manchester. Its AM transmitter is located in Merrimack at the location of its original studio building. Its signal is simulcast on translator station W260CF at 99.9 MHz.  The FM transmitter is located on Mount Uncanoonuc in Goffstown.

WFEA operates with a directional antenna both day and night. One of the towers in the Merrimack array is a diamond-shaped "Blaw-Knox", a smaller version of the famous Blaw Knox tower of WLW in Cincinnati, Ohio.  WFEA is owned and operated by Saga Communications of New England LLC, which also owns 95.7 WZID and 96.5 WMLL. WFEA is simulcast on the HD2 channel of WMLL.  Until February 1, 2017, it was on the HD3 channel of WZID.

Programming
On weekdays, WFEA carries syndicated shows hosted by Doug Stephan, Hugh Hewitt, Clark Howard, Boston-based Howie Carr, Mark Levin, John Batchelor and Red Eye Radio.  On weekends, shows on money, health, home repair, travel, cars and technology are heard, some of which are paid brokered programming.  Weekend syndicated hosts include Kim Komando, Lars Larson and Bill Handel.  Most hours begin with CBS Radio News.

History

Early years
WFEA has been broadcasting continuously since 9:00 a.m. on March 1, 1932, making it New Hampshire's oldest radio station. It has always had the same call sign.  Over the years, WFEA has had 10 owners.  On March 1, 1932, WFEA became an affiliate of the Yankee Network and CBS.

Before the enactment of the North American Regional Broadcasting Agreement (NARBA) in 1941, WFEA broadcast on 1340 kilocycles.  It transmitted with 1,000 watts by day and 500 watts at night.  It was owned by the New Hampshire Broadcasting Company.

Move to AM 1370
After NARBA, WFEA shifted to AM 1370, with 5,000 watts around the clock.  WFEA switched its affiliation to the NBC Red Network and the Mutual Broadcasting System.  During the "Golden Age of Radio," WFEA carried NBC and Mutual's schedule of dramas, comedies, news, sports, soap operas, game shows and big band broadcasts.

As network programming shifted from radio to TV, in the 1950s and 1960s, WFEA evolved into a Top 40 sound.  As contemporary music listeners switched to FM, WFEA began airing a full service Hot AC format in the mid-1980s.  By the late 1980s, it switched to mainstream adult contemporary music.

Adult standards, talk, and sports
In 1990, WFEA switched to a satellite-delivered adult standards format, known as "America's Best Music", from Westwood One.  It featured artists such as Frank Sinatra, Tony Bennett, The Carpenters, Dionne Warwick, Barry Manilow, Neil Diamond, Elvis Presley, Barbra Streisand, and Nat "King" Cole.  In November 1990, WFEA was acquired by Saga Communications.

The music format was discontinued in February 2015 and WFEA switched to talk programming.  WFEA had broadcast Manchester Wolves Arena Football League games before the team folded at the end of the 2009 season, and the University of New Hampshire college football and basketball games.

Translator

References

External links

FEA
News and talk radio stations in the United States
Manchester, New Hampshire
Hillsborough County, New Hampshire
Radio stations established in 1932
1932 establishments in New Hampshire